AETC may stand for:

 AIDS Education and Training Centers, a US network of sites that provide education on HIV and related co-morbidities
 Air Education and Training Command, of the U.S. Air Force's nine major commands
 Armoured Engineer Training Centre, a battalion of the Singapore Combat Engineers
 Alabama Educational Television Commission, the state government agency which owns Alabama Public Television
 Arkansas Educational Television Commission, the state government agency which owns Arkansas PBS